The Husband Who Was to Mind the House is a Norwegian fairy tale collected by Peter Christen Asbjørnsen and Jørgen Moe in their Norske Folkeeventyr.

It is Aarne-Thompson type 1408 The man who does his wife's work.

Synopsis
A husband complained so much about his wife that she suggested that he stay home and do her work.  He agrees.  He starts to churn butter, but decides to get ale.  He hears the pig upstairs, runs to stop it, but does not arrive in time to keep it from overturning the churn, and forgets the ale, which runs all over the cellar.

He got more milk to churn, but remembered that the cow was still in the barn.  Since he could not take her to the meadow, he decided to put her on the sod roof.  He carried the churn to keep the baby from overturning it, but he went for water for the cow, and spilled all the milk down the well.

It was near dinner and he hadn't any butter.  He set on the water to boil for porridge, but went up to tie the cow so she wouldn't fall off, and tied the end of the rope to himself.  He went to grind grain for the porridge, but the cow fell off, and because he had run the rope through the chimney, it dragged him up.  The wife returned and cut the rope so the cow came down but she found her husband with his head stuck in the pot.

References

Norwegian fairy tales
ATU 1350-1439
Asbjørnsen and Moe